The Bob Thiele Collective was an "all-star" American jazz ensemble which recorded three albums for Bob Thiele's record label Red Baron.  Thiele assembled and produced the three different groups.

Discography
1990: Sunrise Sunset (David Murray, John Hicks, Cecil McBee, Andrew Cyrille)
1991: Louis Satchmo (Joshua Redman, Red Rodney, Kenny Barron, Santi Debriano, Grady Tate)
1993: Lion Hearted (Gary Bartz, Ravi Coltrane, Steve Marcus, Ray Anderson,  Ray Drummond, Roy Hargrove, Kenny Barron, Grady Tate)

References

American jazz ensembles